Peter Robbins (born Louis G. Nanasi; August 10, 1956 – January 18, 2022) was an American actor. He gained national fame in the 1960s as being the first actor to voice Charlie Brown in the Peanuts animated specials. He was one of the most famous child actors of the 1960s.

Early life
Peter Robbins was born Louis G. Nanasi in Los Angeles, California, on August 10, 1956. Robbins was of Hungarian descent. He graduated from the University of California, San Diego in 1979. His sister was the actress Ahna Capri (Anna Marie Nanasi).

Career
Robbins first began acting in various films and television shows at the age of seven. As a child, he made a guest appearance as Elmer in the popular series The Munsters. Most distinctly, at the age of nine, Robbins provided the voice of the emponymous character Charlie Brown, whom he considered to be his childhood hero, in one television documentary, six Peanuts television specials and one movie from 1963 to 1969, including the film A Boy Named Charlie Brown and the television specials A Charlie Brown Christmas and It's the Great Pumpkin, Charlie Brown. At the age of fourteen, Robbins was replaced by younger child actors in the Peanuts specials produced after the 1960s, but his trademark scream of "AAUGH!", first used in A Boy Named Charlie Brown (1969), continued to be used in later specials for Charlie Brown and other Peanuts characters.

Robbins appeared in an episode of F Troop in 1966 entitled "The Sergeant and the Kid" and appeared in an episode of Get Smart as the mysterious Dr. T. He also appeared in the Sonny & Cher film, Good Times. Robbins retired from the entertainment industry in 1972, and later pursued his career in real estate, with brief stints in radio. In 1996, he hosted a talk radio show in Palm Springs, California, at KPSL 1010 Talk Radio. By 2006, according to a broadcast by National Public Radio, he was managing real estate in Van Nuys. By 2020, after finally receiving the correct medication for his lifetime bipolar disorder, Robbins was back, signing autographs of the Charlie Brown Christmas book in public appearances at Comic-Con conventions across the United States. Robbins explained the path which led to his recovery in an October 2019 television interview with Fox 5 San Diego reporter Phil Bauer. At the time of his death, Robbins was working on his autobiography, Confessions of a Blockhead, detailing his life, his jail experiences, and his future.

Personal life and death
Robbins had a lifelong battle with mental illness. Despite his personal struggles, he remained attached to Charlie Brown and even had a tattoo of Charlie Brown and Snoopy on his arm.

Robbins died by suicide on January 18, 2022, at the age of 65. His death was announced the following week on January 25, 2022.

Legal issues
On January 20, 2013, Robbins was arrested by San Diego County Sheriff's Department deputies at Homeland Security's Port of Entry in San Ysidro, California, while re-entering the United States, and charged with "four felony counts of making a threat to cause death or great bodily injury and one felony count of stalking." The four counts involved four victims, including a San Diego Police sergeant, whom Robbins reportedly threatened with bodily harm on January 13, 2013. He was held on $550,000 bond. On May 8, 2013, he was sentenced to a year in jail for threatening his former girlfriend and stalking her plastic surgeon, but he was allowed to log time in treatment instead. After release, he was sent to a residential drug treatment center.

In 2015, Robbins was arrested for multiple probation violations, including drinking alcohol and failing to complete mandatory domestic violence classes. On June 5, 2015, he was ordered to undergo a mental health exam after an outburst during a court proceeding in San Diego.
On December 7, 2015, Robbins was sentenced to four years and eight months in prison as part of a plea agreement for sending threatening letters to the manager (and the manager's wife) of the mobile home park in which he lived in Oceanside. 

Robbins had stated at previous hearings that he had bipolar disorder and paranoid schizophrenia. Robbins was incarcerated at the California Institution for Men in Chino and was transferred to a psychiatric hospital because of his mental state. He was released on parole in October 2019 after serving 80 percent of his sentence, on the conditions that he did not drink alcohol or take any illegal drugs.

Filmography

Film

Television

Awards

References

External links

 
 
 
 Portrait of Peter Robbins, 1971. Los Angeles Times Photographic Archive (Collection 1429). UCLA Library Special Collections, Charles E. Young Research Library, University of California, Los Angeles.

1956 births
2022 deaths
2022 suicides
20th-century American male actors
American male child actors
American male television actors
American male voice actors
American people of Hungarian descent
American real estate businesspeople
Businesspeople from Los Angeles
Male actors from Los Angeles
People from Oceanside, California
People with bipolar disorder
People with schizophrenia
Prisoners and detainees of California
Suicides in California
University of California, San Diego alumni